The 2021 Big Ten Conference men's soccer season is the 31st season of men's varsity soccer in the conference. The season began in August 2021 and concluded in November 2021.

The season will culminate with the 2021 Big Ten Men's Soccer Tournament to determine the conference's automatic berth into the 2021 NCAA Division I Men's Soccer Tournament.

Background

Previous season 

The previous season was the 30th season of men's varsity soccer in the conference. Due to the COVID-19 pandemic, the 2020 Big Ten regular season was postponed and began on February 3, 2021 and concluded on April 17, 2021. The season culminated with the 2020 Big Ten Men's Soccer Tournament to determine the conference's automatic berth into the 2020 NCAA Division I Men's Soccer Tournament.  Indiana defeated Penn State in the Big Ten Men's Soccer Championship Game.

With the Big Ten title, Indiana earned the conference's automatic berth into the 2020 NCAA Tournament, where Maryland, and Penn State joined as at-large berths. Maryland was eliminated in the Second Round, while Penn State were eliminated in the Third Round, and Indiana lost in the 2020 NCAA Division I Men's Soccer Championship Game.

Head coaches

Preseason

Preseason poll 
The preseason poll was released on August 23, 2021. Indiana was selected unanimously as the favorite to win the Big Ten.

Preseason national polls 
The preseason national polls were released in August 2021.

Postseason

Big Ten Tournament 

The Big Ten Tournament is being held from November 7–14.

References

External links 
 Big Ten Men's Soccer

 
2021 NCAA Division I men's soccer season
2021